RFM is a Portuguese music radio station which belongs to r/com (Rádio Renascença group). The station plays mainly contemporary pop music, especially national and international hits.

Coverage 

RFM has an extensive FM national network which covers most of the population living in Portugal mainland. Additionally, the station has a transmitter in São Miguel island (Azores), reaching both São Miguel and Santa Maria islands, and a transmitter located in Madeira, covering not only that island, but also Porto Santo.

External links 
 
 FM frequencies for RFM (in Portuguese)

Radio stations in Portugal
Portuguese-language radio stations
Radio stations established in 1987
1987 establishments in Portugal